Zinc finger protein 281 is a protein that in humans is encoded by the ZNF281 gene.

See also
Zinc finger

References

Further reading

External links 
 

Transcription factors